Iosra Abdelaziz (born 7 December 1999 in Segrate) is a retired Italian artistic gymnast. She represented Italy at the 2014 Summer Youth Olympics and won the silver medal on the uneven bars.

Junior career 
Abdelaziz's international debut was at the 2014 International Gymnix in Montreal, and she won a bronze medal with the Italian team. She also won a team bronze medal at the City of Jesolo Trophy, and additionally, she placed fifth on bars and eighth in the all-around. At the Munich Friendly she won a bronze medal in the all-around and with the team. At the Junior European Championships, she helped the Italian team place fifth. Then, she won the silver medal in the all-around behind Elisa Meneghini at the National Championships in addition to a bronze on the floor exercise.

Abdelaziz was selected to represent Italy at the 2014 Youth Olympics. She qualified fifth into the all-around final with a score of 53.150. In the all-around final, she finished sixth. She won the silver medal on the uneven bars, and she placed fourth on the balance beam and sixth on the floor exercise.

Senior career 
Abdelaziz's senior debut was delayed due to an ankle injury in January 2015. She returned to competition at the 2015 2nd Italian Serie A2 where she scored a 13.250 on the uneven bars, and she scored a 13.000 at the 3rd Italian Serie A2. She then had surgery on her foot, and
after this surgery, Abdelaziz only competed uneven bars, and she only attended domestic competitions. In 2016, she competed at four Italian Serie A2 events, but her highest score was only an 11.900. She is now retired from gymnastics.

Personal life
Born in Italy, Abdelaziz is of Egyptian descent.

References 

1999 births
Living people
People from Segrate 
Italian female artistic gymnasts
Italian people of Egyptian descent
Italian sportspeople of African descent
Gymnasts at the 2014 Summer Youth Olympics
Sportspeople from the Metropolitan City of Milan
21st-century Italian women